Faramarz (Persian: فرامرز) is a Persian masculine given name that may refer to

Faramarz Asadi, Kurdish leader and tribal chief in Iran and Iraq
Faramarz Asef (born 1950), Iranian triple jumper
Faramarz Aslani (born 1954), Iranian singer, guitarist, composer, songwriter, and producer
Faramarz Fekr, American engineer
Faramarz Gharibian, Iranian actor and director
Faramarz Khodnegah (born 1965), Iranian strongman and powerlifter
Faramarz Payvar (1933–2009), Iranian composer and santur player
Faramarz Pilaram (1937–1983), Iranian painter
Faramarz Tamanna (born 1977), Afghan politician
Faramarz Vakili Iranian film director, writer and producer
Faramarz Zelli (born 1940), Iranian football player

Iranian masculine given names